Gustav Ortner (17 February 1935 – 7 February 2022) was an Austrian diplomat. He was Austrian Ambassador to the Holy See from 1997 to 2001. He died on 7 February 2022, at the age of 86.

References

1935 births
2022 deaths
Austrian diplomats
Ambassadors of Austria to the Holy See
Members of the Teutonic Order
Cartellverband members
Knights Grand Cross of the Order of Pope Pius IX
Knights Grand Cross of the Order of Merit of the Italian Republic
Diplomats from Vienna